Ahmet Özhan (born August 26, 1950) is a prominent Turkish classic music singer, conductor, and actor.

Biography 

He started singing in Turkish clubs when he was about 18. He performed concerts all around Europe, the US, and the Middle East with his group.

Discography 
Albums
 2016: Ahmet Özhan "Best Off İlahiler"
 2013: Son Nebi
 2012: Itri
 2007: Yüzyılın Şarkıları
 2005: Mevlana'nın Dilinden
 2005: Hüzünlü Gurbet
 2003: Rüya
 2003: Nostalji
 1999: Güldeste 3
 1998: Güldeste 2
 1988: Gel
 1987: Hoşgeldin and Geceler Gariplerindir
 1985: Ömrümün Baharı
 1984: Hüzün
 1981: Güneşin Battığı Yerde
 1978: Geceler Gariplerindir
 1977: Bir Tanem
 1976: Ahmet Özhan 76
 1975: Günümüzün Sevilen Şarkılrı ile Ahmet Özhan
 1974: Ahmet Özhan

Filmography 
 Sözün Bittiği Yer, 2006
 Gönülden Gönüle, 1987
 Hafız Yusuf Efendi, 1987
 Aliş ile Zeynep, 1984
 Hacı Arif Bey, 1982
 Çaresiz, 1978
 Küçük Bey, 1975
 Bak Yeşil Yeşil, 1975
 Çocuğumu İstiyorum, 1973

External links 

 
 

Living people
1950 births
People from Şanlıurfa
Turkish-language singers
Turkish male singers
Turkish classical singers
Performers of Sufi music
Turkish male film actors
20th-century Turkish male actors
State Artists of Turkey
Musicians of Ottoman classical music
Musicians of Turkish makam music